Walking Dead or The Walking Dead may refer to:

Arts, entertainment and media

The Walking Dead franchise 
The Walking Dead (franchise)
 The Walking Dead (comic book) 2003–2019, source material
 The Walking Dead (TV series), 2010–2022, based on the comic
 The Walking Dead: Original Soundtrack – Vol. 1, 2013
 Fear the Walking Dead, 2015, spin-off series
 The Walking Dead: World Beyond, 2020–2021, spin-off series
 Tales of the Walking Dead, 2022, spin-off series
 The Walking Dead: Dead City, 2023, spin-off series 
 The Walking Dead (video game series), 2012–2019, based on the comic
 The Walking Dead (video game), 2012
The Walking Dead (pinball machine), 2014, based on the TV series

 Films 
 The Walking Dead (1936 film)
 The Walking Dead (1995 film)

Literature
 Walking Dead, a 2008 novel in the Atticus Kodiak series by Greg Rucka
 The Walking Dead, a 2000 novel by Gerald Seymour

 Music 
 "Walking Dead", a 2002 song by Puressence from the album Planet Helpless "Walking Dead", a 2005 song by Z-Trip
 "Walking Dead", a 2012 song by Papa Roach from The Connection "The Walking Dead (EP)", by Saint Vitus, 1985
 "The Walking Dead", a 2005 song by Dropkick Murphys from The Warrior's Code "The Walking Dead", a 2006 song by Zebrahead from Broadcast to the World "The Walking Dead", a 2008 song by Spinnerette from Spinnerette Other uses 
 1st Battalion, 9th Marines, nicknamed "The Walking Dead", an infantry battalion of the U.S. Marine Corps

 See also 
 Dead Man Walking (disambiguation)
 Night of the Living Dead (disambiguation)
 Undead (disambiguation)
 Zombie (disambiguation)
 "The Waking Dead", a 2013 episode of supernatural drama television series Grimm''